Biliești is a commune located in Vrancea County, Romania. It is composed of a single village, Biliești. It was part of Suraia Commune until 2004, when it was split off to form a separate commune.

References

Communes in Vrancea County
Localities in Western Moldavia